James Crewdson Turner (born June 25, 1946) is an intellectual historian and Cavanaugh Professor of Humanities Emeritus at the University of Notre Dame. After receiving his PhD from Harvard University in 1975, he taught at the College of Charleston (1975–1977), the University of Massachusetts Boston (1977–1984), and the University of Michigan (1984–1995) before moving to Notre Dame.

In 1980, James authored Reckoning with the Beast: Animals, Pain, and Humanity in the Victorian Mind, which documented the history of animal welfare that emerged in Britain during the early 19th-century and spread to the United States after the Civil War.

Selected publications 
 Reckoning with the Beast: Animals, Pain, and Humanity in the Victorian Mind, Johns Hopkins University Press, 1980
 Without God, Without Creed: The Origins of Unbelief in America, Johns Hopkins University Press, 1985
 The Liberal Education of Charles Eliot Norton, Johns Hopkins University Press, 1999
 The Sacred and the Secular University (with Jon H. Roberts), Princeton University Press, 2000  
 Language, Religion, Knowledge: Past and Present, University of Notre Dame Press, 2003
 The Future of Christian Learning: An Evangelical and Catholic Dialogue (with Mark A. Noll), Brazos Press, 2008
 Religion Enters the Academy: The Origins of the Scholarly Study of Religion in America, University of Georgia Press, 2011
 Philology: The Forgotten Origins of the Modern Humanities, Princeton University Press, 2014

References 

1946 births
20th-century American historians
20th-century American male writers
21st-century American historians
21st-century American male writers
American animal welfare scholars
American male non-fiction writers
American Roman Catholic religious writers
College of Charleston faculty
Harvard University alumni
Historians of animal rights
Intellectual historians
Living people
Roman Catholic scholars
University of Massachusetts Boston faculty
University of Michigan faculty
University of Notre Dame faculty